VisiBroker is an object request broker (ORB) from Borland that fully supports the CORBA standard. VisiBroker for Java is written in Java and can run in any Java environment. VisiBroker for C++ provides ANSI C++ interfaces for maximum source portability.
VisiBroker offers features such as support for the C++ programming language, object naming, the ability to distribute objects across a network, support for persistent objects, dynamic object creation and interoperability with other ORB implementations.

References

Common Object Request Broker Architecture